Francis Ernest Wentworth-Sheilds   OBE (also spelt Shields; 16 November 1869 – 10 May 1959) was a British civil engineer.

Francis Ernest Sheilds was born in London in 1869, the younger son of engineer Francis Webb Sheilds. Rev. Wentworth Wentworth-Sheilds was his elder brother. The family added the surname Wentworth in 1877. He was educated at St Paul's School in London and Owens College, Manchester.

He was appointed to be a Major of the Territorial Army's Engineer and Railway Staff Corps, an unpaid, volunteer unit which provides technical expertise to the British Army, on 28 March 1925. He served as president of the Institution of Civil Engineers for the November 1944 to November 1945 session. Wentworth-Shields was an Officer of the Order of the British Empire. He died in 1959 in Southampton.

References

Bibliography

External links

        
        
        
        
        
        

1869 births
1959 deaths
Engineers from London
British civil engineers
Officers of the Order of the British Empire
Engineer and Railway Staff Corps officers
Presidents of the Institution of Civil Engineers
Presidents of the Institution of Structural Engineers